Razakan Rural District is in the Central District of Shahriar County, Tehran province, Iran. At the National Census of 2006, its population was 25,395 in 6,293 households. There were 26,420 inhabitants in 7,122 households at the following census of 2011. At the most recent census of 2016, the population of the rural district was 26,004 in 7,517 households. The largest of its 11 villages was Razakan, with 5,460 people.

References 

Shahriar County

Rural Districts of Tehran Province

Populated places in Tehran Province

Populated places in Shahriar County